Minshull v Minshull (1737) 26 ER 260 is an English trusts law case, concerning the principle of certainty for a will, known then as a "devise".

Facts
Richard Lester wrote a testament to devise a house to the eldest son of his nephew, Randal Minshull, and in default other male heirs (the eldest was another Randal, the second John). It said:

There was also a provision that whoever inherited should pay other brothers and sisters £20 a piece. Randal died without children. It passed to John, who gave the property to his youngest son, instead of his eldest son. The question was whether this was allowed, or the will had meant the second son of the second Randall Minshull (i.e. not Richard Lester's nephew, but Richard Lester's nephew's son). Those potential inheritors were claiming for rents.

Judgment
Lord Hardwicke LC held that the will was valid, and on the true construction, the property was to pass to John's sons.

Significance
Robinson v Robinson (1756) 96 ER 999, Lord Mansfield took over the case upon Ryder CJ's death, and held a will valid, "to effectuate the manifest general intent of the testator". It appeared that Ryder CJ was tending the opposite way, remarking "The general question is on the will, which is so dark, and obscure, that I defy any one, lawyer, or not, to say, with any certainty, what the testator intended."
Doe d. Winter v Perratt (1843) 9 Cl&F 606, 689, Lord Brougham said: 'The difficulty must be so great that it amounts to an impossibility, the doubt so grave that there is not even an inclination of the scales one way'
In re Roberts (1881) 19 ChD 520, 529, Sir George Jessel MR said that the court would not hold a will void for uncertainty 'unless it is utterly impossible to put a meaning upon it. The duty of the court is to put a fair meaning on the terms used, and not, as was said in one case, to repose on the easy pillow of saying that the whole is void for uncertainty'
Fawcett Properties Ltd v Buckingham County Council [1961] AC 636
Re Tuck's Settlement Trusts [1977] EWCA Civ 11

See also
English trust law

References

English trusts case law
Court of Chancery cases
1737 in British law